Gerald Robert "Jerry" Molen (born January 6, 1935) is an American film producer and actor. He has worked closely with Steven Spielberg, having produced five of his films, and won an Academy Award for co-producing Schindler's List. In 2019, Movicorp announced Molen will be producing Sweet By and By, a multi-racial southern gothic romantic thriller; and in 2021, Molen began initial preparations of the mini-series. Molen is now semi-retired and spends his time alternating between Montana and Las Vegas, Nevada.

Life and career
Molen was born in Great Falls, Montana, the son of Edith Lorraine (née Meyer) and Gerald Richard Molen. He grew up in North Hollywood, California, after moving from Montana, with a number of younger brothers and sisters. His mother ran a diner, "The Blue Onion", which was located across from one of the major studios. Molen got his start in the movie business by changing tires on studio trucks.

Molen has appeared in supporting roles or cameos in several of the films he has produced, including Rain Man, Days of Thunder, and Jurassic Park.  The name 'Molen' can be seen painted on the front of a large black cauldron in the movie Hook as the camera pans across the pirate docks in Neverland.

Molen produced 2016: Obama's America, a documentary film critical of American President Barack Obama, during the 2012 presidential campaign.

In 2016, when a second consecutive year of an all-white Oscar nominee list brought accusations of discrimination in Hollywood and the threat of an Oscar boycott, Molen called the idea of a boycott "ridiculous." "There is no racism except for those who create an issue,” he said.  “That is the worst kind. Using such an ugly way of complaining.”

Molen is an active member of the Church of Jesus Christ of Latter-day Saints and is a conservative.

Filmography
 Tootsie (1982) (unit production manager)
 A Soldier's Story (1984) (unit production manager)
 The Color Purple (1985) (unit production manager)
 *batteries not included (1987) (associate producer)
 Rain Man (1988) (co-producer, actor)
 Days of Thunder (1990) (executive producer, actor)
 Hook (1991) (producer)
 Jurassic Park (1993) (producer, actor)
 Schindler's List (1993) (producer)
 The Flintstones (1994) (executive producer)
 The Little Rascals (1994) (producer)
 Casper (1995) (executive producer)
 The Trigger Effect (1996) (executive producer)
 Twister (1996) (executive producer)
 Amistad (1997) (actor)
 The Lost World: Jurassic Park (1997) (producer)
 The Other Side of Heaven (2001) (producer, actor)
 Catch Me If You Can (2002) (actor)
 Minority Report (2002) (producer)
 The Legend of Johnny Lingo (2003) (producer)
 Beyond the Blackboard (2011) (executive producer)
 2016: Obama's America (2012) (producer)
 America: Imagine the World Without Her (2014) (producer)
 The Abolitionists (2016) (producer)
 Hillary's America: The Secret History of the Democratic Party (2016) (producer)
 The Meg (2018) (executive producer)
 Death of a Nation (2018)

References

External links

1935 births
American film producers
American Latter Day Saints
Living people
 Montana Republicans
People from Great Falls, Montana
Filmmakers who won the Best Film BAFTA Award
Golden Globe Award-winning producers
Producers who won the Best Picture Academy Award